In mathematics, the Ikeda lift is a lifting of modular forms to Siegel modular forms. The existence of the lifting was conjectured by W. Duke and Ö. It generalized the Saito–Kurokawa lift from modular forms of weight 2k to genus 2 Siegel modular forms of weight k + 1.

Statement

Suppose that k and n are positive integers of the same parity.  The Ikeda lift takes a Hecke eigenform of weight 2k for SL2(Z) to a Hecke eigenform in the space of Siegel modular forms of weight k+n, degree 2n.

Example

The Ikeda lift takes the Delta function (the weight 12 cusp form for SL2(Z)) to the Schottky form, a weight 8 Siegel cusp form of degree 4. Here k=6 and n=2.

References

Modular forms